XHVM-FM is a radio station on 100.9 FM in Piedras Negras, Coahuila. It is owned by Grupo Zócalo and carries a retro format known as Back FM 100.9.

History
XHVM began as XEVM-AM 1240, receiving its concession on July 24, 1969. It moved to FM in 2011.

References

Radio stations in Coahuila